Pitjantjatjara (or ) is a dialect of the Western Desert language traditionally spoken by the Pitjantjatjara people of Central Australia. It is mutually intelligible with other varieties of the Western Desert language, and is particularly closely related to the Yankunytjatjara dialect. The names for the two groups are based on their respective words for 'come/go.' 

Pitjantjatjara is a relatively healthy Aboriginal language, with children learning it. It is taught in some Aboriginal schools. The literacy rate for first language speakers is 50–70%; and is 10–15% for second-language learners. There is a Pitjantjatjara dictionary, and the New Testament of the Bible has been translated into the language, a project started at the Ernabella Mission in the early 1940s and completed in 2002. Work continues on the Old Testament.

Phonology and orthography

Pitjantjatjara has the following consonant inventory, orthography shown in brackets:

Pitjantjatjara has three vowels:

Pitjantjatjara vowels have a length contrast, indicated by writing them doubled.

Pitjantjatjara orthography includes the following underlined letters, which can be either ordinary letters with underline formatting, or Unicode characters which include a line below:

The underline represents that the consonant in question is retroflex, rather than alveolar.

The only word in Pitjantjatjara that uses at least one letter absent from the Pitjantjatjara alphabet is the word Jesu ("Jesus"), which uses the letter "s" which is not present in the Pitjantjatjara alphabet. Furthermore, the letter "j" is only present in the digraph "tj".

Grammar
Some features distinctive to the Pitjantjatjara dialect, as opposed to other Western Desert Language dialects, include -pa endings to words that simply end in a consonant in other dialects (this is reflective of a general aversion in Pitjantjatjara to words ending with a consonant), and a reluctance to have y at the beginning of words.

Nouns and noun phrases
Pitjantjatjara uses case marking to show the role of nouns within the clause as subject, object, location, etc. Pitjantjatjara is a language with split ergativity, since its nouns and pronouns show different case marking patterns.

Consider the following example, where the subject of a transitive verb is marked with the ergative case and the object with the absolutive case:

It can be contrasted with the following sentence with an intransitive verb, where the subject takes the absolutive case:

In contrast to the ergative-absolutive pattern that applies to nouns, pronouns show a nominative-accusative pattern. Consider the following examples, with pronoun subjects:

Verbs and verb phrases
Pitjantjatjara verbs inflect for tense. Pitjantjatjara has four different classes of verbs, each of which takes slightly different endings (the classes are named according to their imperative suffixes): ∅-class verbs, -class verbs, -class verbs, and -class verbs. See page on grammatical conjugation for examples.

Derivational morphology
It also has systematic ways of changing words from one part of speech to another: making nouns from verbs, and vice versa. However, words formed may have slightly different meanings that cannot be guessed from the pattern alone.

History since European settlement
The Ernabella Mission was established by Charles Duguid and the Presbyterian Church of Australia in 1937 at the location now known as Pukatja, supported by the South Australian government. The Mission aimed to keep the language and culture alive, with the missionaries learning the language themselves and teaching it in the school as well as delivering sermons in it. This meant that the language became a written language for the first time, and the people became literate in their own language before English.

Bible translations
The first draft of the New Testament's Gospel of Mark, Tjukurpa Palja Markaku, was completed in 1945 by Reverend Bob Love and Ronald Trudinger at the Mission, and was published by the British and Foreign Bible Society in 1949. Work continued over the next 20 years, with publication of a shorter New Testament in 1969 by the Bible Society Australia. Pitjantjatjara Bible Translation Project, incorporated in 1981, completed a new translation of the New Testament and about 15% of the Old Testament, first published in 2002. In 2011 a new project to translate the rest of the OT was initiated,  working on various OT books. 21st-century Bible Society missionary and local teacher since 1973, Paul Eckert, has worked with elders on the project for many years. The Book of Daniel was published in 2015, and the Pitjantjatjara version of the New Testament is available online. 

In 2017 members of the Pitjantjatjara Bible Translation Project and partners began a multi-voice recording of the Pitjantjatjara New Testament, with 50% completed by 2017.

Government policies

APY lands schools taught a bilingual curriculum until the late 1980s, when the programs were defunded, and teaching reverted to English only. In December 2018 it was announced that the South Australian Government would commit to teaching in the Pitjantjatjara and Yankunytjatjara languages, with English as an additional language, by 2029.

Loan words
Pitjantjatjara includes several loan words from English.

Word of the Year 2019 short-listing 
The Pitjantjatjara word ngangkari, added to the Macquarie Dictionary in 2019 and defined as an Indigenous practitioner of bush medicine, was short-listed for the 2019 Word of the Year.

Technical support 

LibreOffice provides locale data and a spellchecker for Pitjantjatjara.

Notes

References

Further reading

 Langlois, Annie (2004). Alive and Kicking: Areyonga Teenage Pitjantjatjara, Research School of Pacific and Asian Studies. 

Western Desert language